Khav and Mirabad District ( - Khav va Mirabad) is a district (bakhsh) in Marivan County, Kurdistan Province, Iran. At the 2006 census, its population was 11,849, in 2,513 families.  The District has one city Bardeh Rasheh.  The District has one rural district (dehestan): Khav and Mirabad Rural District.

References 

Marivan County
Districts of Kurdistan Province